The Copa do Brasil 1998 was the 10th staging of the Copa do Brasil.

The competition started on January 20, 1998, and concluded on May 30, 1998, with the second leg of the final, held at the Estádio do Morumbi in São Paulo, in which Palmeiras lifted the trophy for the first time with a 2–0 victory over Cruzeiro.

Romário, of Flamengo, with 7 goals, was the competition's topscorer.

Format
The preliminary round was disputed by 20 clubs, while the first stage was disputed by 32 clubs, including the ones qualified from the preliminary stage. The competition was disputed in a knock-out format. In the preliminary stage and in the first round if the away team won the first leg with an advantage of at least two goals, the second leg was not played and the club automatically qualified to the next round. The following rounds were played over two legs and the away goals rule was used.

Competition stages

Preliminary round

|}

Knockout stages

References
 Copa do Brasil 1998 at RSSSF
 Copa do Brasil top scorers at Campeões do Futebol
Enciclopédia do Futebol Brasileiro, Volume 2 - Lance, Rio de Janeiro: Aretê Editorial S/A, 2001.

1998
1998 in Brazilian football
1998 domestic association football cups